Pronasoona is a genus of Southeast Asian sheet weavers that was first described by Alfred Frank Millidge in 1995.

Species
 it contains two species:
Pronasoona aurata Millidge, 1995 – Thailand
Pronasoona sylvatica Millidge, 1995 (type) – Malaysia (Borneo)

See also
 List of Linyphiidae species (I–P)

References

Araneomorphae genera
Linyphiidae
Spiders of Asia